Denée may refer to:

Places
Denée, Belgium, part of the municipality of Anhée located in the province of Namur
Denée, Maine-et-Loire, a commune in the Maine-et-Loire department in France

People
Denée Benton (b. 1991), American actress and singer

See also
 Dene, an indigenous people in northern Canada
 Diné, an indigenous people in the southwestern US